Maximiliano Villalobos Miranda (born 26 January 1928) is a Costa Rican former footballer who played professionally in the Colombian Professional Football League and Mexican Primera División. He also represented Costa Rica at international level.

Career

Club
Born in Heredia, Villalobos played as a defender. He began his career with Herediano, making his Costa Rican Primera División debut in 1947. He helped the club win three titles, two of them in his first stint with the club.

Villalobos began playing professional football in Colombia with Universidad de Bogotá in 1949. After three seasons with Universidad, he joined Cúcuta Deportivo for one season before returning to Herediano.

Villalobos would sign with Mexican Primera División side Deportivo Irapuato in 1955. He would play with Irapuato for 13 seasons, becoming an important part of the team for over a decade.

International
Villalobos made six appearances for the Costa Rica national football team, captaining the side to the 1955 CCCF Championship title.

Managerial
After he retired from playing, Villalobos became a football coach. He led Deportivo Irapuato a few months after finishing playing for the club. He was manager of Deportivo México in 1973 and he also led L.D. Alajuelense during the 1983 season, unexpectedly leaving while the club led the league with 14 matches remaining. He retired in 1983.

Personal life
Villalobos is married to Colombian Ligia Castañeda. They have 2 daughters and a son.

References

1928 births
Living people
People from Heredia Province
Association football defenders
Costa Rican footballers
Costa Rica international footballers
C.S. Herediano footballers
Cúcuta Deportivo footballers
Irapuato F.C. footballers
Liga FPD players
Liga MX players
Categoría Primera A players
Costa Rican expatriate footballers
Expatriate footballers in Colombia
Expatriate footballers in Mexico
Costa Rican football managers
L.D. Alajuelense managers
C.S. Herediano managers